Targett is a surname. Notable people with the surname include:

Archibald Targett (1862–1931), Canadian politician
Ben Targett (born 1972), Australian cricketer
Katie Targett-Adams, Scottish singer and Celtic harpist
Matt Targett (born 1985), Australian swimmer
Matt Targett (born 1995), English footballer
Scott Targett, Canadian businessman
Walter Targett (1849–1918), English-born Australian politician